Manavati (pronounced mānavati, meaning the bride) is a rāgam in Carnatic music (musical scale of South Indian classical music). It is the 5th Melakarta rāgam in the 72 melakarta rāgam system of Carnatic music. In Muthuswami Dikshitar school of Carnatic music, the  5th melakarta is Manōranjani.

Structure and Lakshana

It is the 5th rāgam in the 1st chakra Indu. The mnemonic name is Indu-Ma. The mnemonic phrase is sa ra ga ma pa dhi nu. Its  structure (ascending and descending scale) is as follows (see swaras in Carnatic music for details on below notation and terms):
: 
: 
(this scale uses the notes shuddha rishabham, shuddha gandharam, shuddha madhyamam, chathusruthi dhaivatham, kakali nishadham)

As it is a melakarta rāgam, by definition it is a sampoorna rāgam (has all seven notes in ascending and descending scale). It is the shuddha madhyamam equivalent of Pāvani, which is the 41st melakarta.

Asampurna Melakarta 
Manōranjani is the 5th Melakarta in the original list compiled by Venkatamakhin. The notes used in the scale are the same, but the ascending scale is different. It is a shadava-sampurna raga (6 notes in ascending scale, while full 7 are used in descending scale).
: 
:

Janya rāgams 
Manavati has a few minor janya rāgams (derived scales) associated with it. See List of janya rāgams for full list of rāgams associated with this scale.

Compositions 
Here are a few common compositions sung in concerts, set to Manavati.

Evarito ne delpudu by Thyagaraja
Nijabhaktim by Koteeswara Iyer
Sri Hanumantam by Balamuralikrishna

Couple of compositions are in Manōranjani raga.

 Atu karadani set to Adi tala composed by Thyagaraja
 Balambika set to Matya tala composed by Muthuswami Dikshitar

 Bhaja Bhaja Manasa set to Adi tala composed by Sri PB Shrirangachari

Related rāgams 
This section covers the theoretical and scientific aspect of this rāgam.

Manavati's notes when shifted using Graha bhedam, yields Kantamani rāgam. Graha bhedam is the step taken in keeping the relative note frequencies same, while shifting the shadjam to the next note in the rāgam. For further details and an illustration refer Graha bhedam on Manavati.

Notes

References

Melakarta ragas